Priorities is the debut studio album by English four-piece alternative rock band Don Broco. It was released in the United Kingdom on 13 August 2012. The album has peaked to number 25 on the UK Albums Chart. The album includes the singles "Priorities", "Hold On", and "Whole Truth". After its release the band was nominated for "Best New Rock Artist" in the iTunes UK Best of 2012.

Singles
 "Priorities" was released as the lead single from the album on 11 May 2012.
 "Hold On" was released as the second single from the album on 16 November 2012.
 "Whole Truth" was released as the third single from the album on 19 April 2013.

Track listing

Charts

Release history

References

2012 debut albums
Don Broco albums